The following table shows regularly-scheduled United States Senate elections by state by year. The table does not include appointments or special elections, though it does include elections that occurred upon a state delegation's admission or readmission to the Senate. The table also includes elections that filled vacancies to unexpired terms that had never been filled due to legislative deadlock or an elected candidate's failure to qualify. The table does not denote post-election party switching. Note that, particularly prior to the ratification of the 17th Amendment in 1913, many regular elections took place in odd years rather than in the preceding even years.

Legend

Table

Analytical tables
Last updated after the 2014 elections.

Results

States across party systems

''S indicates that a state was split between the two major parties and did not elect either party more than 60 percent of the time. A * sign indicates that a state elected that party at least 80 percent of the time. No * sign indicates that the state elected that party between 60 and 80 percent of the time.

See also
List of United States presidential election results by state
Party divisions of United States Congresses
List of special elections to the United States Senate
List of United States Senate election results by region

References

Notes